Văleni is a commune in Vaslui County, Western Moldavia, Romania. It is composed of two villages, Moara Domnească and Văleni. It included Ferești village until 2004, when it was split off to form a separate commune.

References

Communes in Vaslui County
Localities in Western Moldavia